Belarus competed at the 2002 Winter Paralympics in Salt Lake City, United States. 4 competitors from Belarus won 2 medals, 1 gold and 1 silver, and finished 16th in the medal table.

See also 
 Belarus at the Paralympics
 Belarus at the 2002 Winter Olympics

References 

Belarus at the Paralympics
2002 in Belarusian sport
Nations at the 2002 Winter Paralympics